The Falkland Islands are a British overseas territory and, as such, rely on the United Kingdom for the guarantee of their security. The other UK territories in the South Atlantic, South Georgia and the South Sandwich Islands, fall under the protection of British Forces South Atlantic Islands (BFSAI), formerly known as British Forces Falkland Islands (BFFI), which includes commitments from the British Army, Royal Air Force and Royal Navy. They are headed by the Commander, British Forces South Atlantic Islands (CBFSAI), a brigadier-equivalent appointment that rotates among all three services (Navy, British Army, and RAF).

Argentina invaded and took control of the Falklands on 2 April 1982. The base was opened in 1985, and became fully operational in 1986.

Falkland Islands Defence Force

The Falkland Islands maintains its own part-time volunteer force, the Falkland Islands Defence Force (FIDF), previously known as the Falkland Islands Volunteer Corps. Although this unit existed in 1982 as a reinforcement for the Governor's detachment of Royal Marines, it did not play any part in the main conflict during the war of 1982, its members having spent the duration of the hostilities under house arrest by the Argentines after their surrender on the Argentine capture of the islands. The FIDF is now a platoon to company-strength light infantry unit with a permanent training Warrant Officer seconded from the Royal Marines. The FIDF operates in a number of roles and is fully integrated into the defence scheme for the islands.

The FIDF has reportedly also been trained by the Royal Navy to operate Oerlikon 20 mm cannon and to board vessels suspected of fishery poaching. As of 2022, the Falkland Islands sovereignty and fisheries patrol vessel is the FPV Protegat, which assists in policing the exclusive economic zone around the islands She  will be replaced in 2023 by the MV Lilibet, named in honour of Queen Elizabeth II, and leased to the Falklands Government by Seagull Maritime Limited for fifteen years.

Royal Navy

RAF Mount Pleasant has its own port facility called Mare Harbour, operated by Naval Party 2010 (NP2010). The Royal Navy has a formal commitment, through Atlantic Patrol Task (South), to maintain a potential presence in the area with a frigate or guided missile destroyer accompanied by a Royal Fleet Auxiliary (RFA) vessel in the South Atlantic. However, as of 2019,  was the last frigate to deploy on this tasking in 2015 and, in practice, an offshore patrol vessel, currently , is the principal presence permanently close to the islands. In addition, an Ice Patrol Ship, is on station close to Antarctica for about seven months of the year.

When deployed, the major warship and RFA vessel carry out the Atlantic Patrol Tasking (South) mission, which "provides a maritime presence to protect the UK's interests in the region". The Type 42 destroyer  took over the South Atlantic Patrol Task in October 2006, replacing . As of February 2010, the on-station warship was the Type 42 destroyer . In late April 2010, York was relieved by the Type 23 frigate . In August 2010, Portland was relieved by the Type 42 destroyer . On 21 April 2011, York returned to the East Cove Military Port in the Falkland Islands, beginning patrol duties for the islands. October 2011 saw the arrival of the Type 23 frigate , generating a statement from UNASUR (Union of South American Nations). The Type 45 guided missile destroyer  replaced Montrose as of April 2012. In early August 2013,  was deployed to be the ship for the Royal Navy's Atlantic Patrol. Portland was again deployed in January 2014 and Lancaster deployed in 2015. Since that time, a River-class patrol vessel, initially  and since 2020 HMS Forth, has maintained the commitment. 

HMS Forth arrived in the Islands in January, 2020, and is expected to be on station for a decade or more.

The Royal Navy also has  and -class nuclear submarines that it can deploy to the area, though such deployments are classified. The threat from submarines to hostile ships was demonstrated during the Falklands War when  sank the Argentine cruiser . In February 2012, a Trafalgar-class submarine may have been deployed to the Falkland Islands.

British Army

The British Army maintains a garrison on the Falkland Islands based at Mount Pleasant. The total deployment is about 1,200 personnel made up of a roulement infantry company, an engineer squadron, a signals unit (part of the Joint Communications Unit – see below), a logistics group and supporting services.

Ground-based air defence of RAF Mount Pleasant is provided by the 16th Regiment Royal Artillery of the British Army's 7th Air Defence Group. Up until 2021, the detachment was equipped with the Rapier FSC surface-to-air missile system. Rapier has been replaced with the new Sky Sabre surface-to-air missile system incorporating an expanded capability. Sky Sabre achieved informal initial operating capability at RAF Mount Pleasant in October 2021. In the same month Rapier was fully withdrawn from service on the Falklands.

The British Army contributed to the Joint Service Explosive Ordnance Disposal group in the Falkland Islands, providing 33 Engineer Regiment (EOD) and RLC EOD teams. This was subsequently reduced to a team of 11 personnel. In November 2020, it was announced that all remaining land mines had been cleared from the islands.

Main article: Land mines in the Falkland Islands

Royal Air Force

RAF Mount Pleasant was built in 1985–86, able to accept large trans-Atlantic aircraft such as the Lockheed TriStar. The TriStar was purchased mainly for the UK-Falklands route; until their entry into service, the UK used leased 747s and 767s.

Originally Lockheed Hercules C.1K were used for air-to-air refuelling missions, but these were later replaced by a VC10. On 31 August 2013 the VC10 was replaced by a TriStar K.1 which was itself replaced by a Voyager KC.2 in February 2014. When a fighter is launched, it is almost immediately followed by the tanker as changeable weather conditions might make diversion to another airfield necessary. The Voyager however will be unable to fit within a hangar at RAF Mount Pleasant. 

Four Typhoon aircraft provide air defence for the islands and surrounding territories and have a secondary ground attack/anti-ship role.

The helicopters of No. 1564 Flight (formerly No. 78 Squadron) provided air transport missions. The Sea Kings carried out short and medium range search and rescue missions, until their retirement. AAR Corp was awarded a contract for helicopter search and rescue services in the Falkland Islands to replace 1564 Flight, using AgustaWestland AW189 helicopters in the role from 2016. In March 2015, the UK announced that a pair of Chinooks would be stationed in the Falklands again, the first of which started flying in June 2016. 1564 Flight disbanded in March 2016. 

These military helicopters only remained on the islands for a short period and, as of 2022, Chinooks of No. 1310 Flight are no longer based in the Falklands. In lieu of this military capability, the firm British International Helicopters operates two AW189s (in the Search and Rescue role) and two S61N helicopters (in the support role) from RAF Mount Pleasant.

A C-130 Hercules was used for transport, search and rescue and maritime patrol until replaced with an A400M Atlas C1 in April 2018. In August 2022, an RAF A400M aircraft flying from RAF Ascension Island was refueled for the first time by a Voyager KC.2 aircraft flying out of RAF Mount Pleasant. In January 2023, an RAF A400M Atlas transport aircraft supported by a Voyager tanker aircraft, dropped the first of 300 fuel drums as part of a tasking to resupply the Sky Blu facility of the British Antarctic Survey.

There were initially two air defence radar units, both located on West Falkland; No. 7 Signals Unit at Byron Heights and No. 751 Signals Unit at Mount Alice. Byron Heights and Mount Alice were later augmented by a further radar installation on Mount Kent, designated No. 303 Signals Unit. No. 7 Signals Unit and No. 751 Signals Unit were eventually disbanded and all three radar installations were reduced to Remote Radar Heads under the control of No. 303 Signals Unit who moved into a purpose-built operations building at Mount Pleasant Complex to form the Control and Reporting Centre.  The building was officially opened on 4 October 1998 by Air Chief Marshall Sir Richard Johns, then Chief of the Air Staff.

RAF Ascension Island also reports to the Commander BFSAI.

Organisation

No. 905 Expeditionary Air Wing
No. 1435 Flight4 Eurofighter Typhoons
No. 1312 Flight1 Voyager KC2, 1 Airbus A400M Atlas
 British International Helicopters civilian-crewed aircraft
 2 x Sikorsky S-61N (support role)
 2 x AgustaWestland AW189 (SAR role)

Joint Service
The Joint Communications Unit Falkland Islands (JCUFI) provides the electronic warfare and command and control systems for the Royal Navy, Army and RAF stationed there. It incorporates the Army's signals unit and RAF personnel.

Commanders
The following have served as Commander British Forces Falkland Islands/South Atlantic Islands:
Major General Sir David Thorne, CBFFI (1982–1983)
Major General Keith Spacie, CBFFI (1983–1984)
Major General Peter de la Billière, CBFFI (1984–1985) (left post by 20 November 1985)
Air Marshal Sir John Kemball, CBFFI (1985–1986)
Rear Admiral Christopher Layman, CBFFI (1986–1987)
Major General Anthony Carlier (1987–1988)
Air Vice Marshal David Crwys-Williams (1988–1989)
Major General Paul Stevenson (1989–1990)
Major General Malcolm Hunt (1990–1991)
Air Vice Marshal Peter Beer (1991–1992)
Rear Admiral Neil Rankin (1992–1993)
Major General Iain Mackay-Dick (1993–1994)
Air Commodore Peter Johnson (1994–1995)
Commodore Alexander Backus (1995–1996)
Brigadier Iain Campbell (1996–1998)
Air Commodore Raymond Dixon (1998–1999)
Brigadier David Nicholls (1999–2000)
Brigadier Geoff Sheldon (2000–2001)
Air Vice Marshal John Cliffe (2001–2002)
Vice Admiral Sir Richard Ibbotson (2002)
Brigadier James Gordon (2002–2003)
Air Vice Marshal Richard Lacey (2003–2005)
Rear Admiral Ian Moncrieff (2005–2006)
Brigadier Nick Davies (2006–2008)
Air Commodore Gordon Moulds (2008–2009)
Commodore Philip Thicknesse (2009–2011)
Brigadier William Aldridge (2011–2013)
Air Commodore Russell La Forte (2013–2015)
Commodore Darren Bone (2015–2017)
Brigadier Baz Bennett (2017–2018)
Brigadier Nick Sawyer (2018–2020)
Commodore Jonathan Lett (2020–present)

British Forces South Atlantic Islands installations

See also
 List of British Army installations

Sources

 
Military of South Georgia and the South Sandwich Islands
British Armed Forces deployments
Joint commands of the United Kingdom